"Bellyache" is the first single released by the Britpop band Echobelly in 1993. The songs "Bellyache" and "Give Her A Gun" were re-recorded for their debut album, Everyone's Got One. The other two b-sides, "Sleeping Hitler" and "I Don't Belong Here" were re-recorded and released as b-sides to "Kali Yuga", from the album People Are Expensive. The EP was also released on 12" vinyl.

The song was included on both of the greatest hits albums that Echobelly have released; I Can't Imagine The World Without Me and The Best Of Echobelly. The b-sides were also re-released on the expanded version of Everyone's Got One.

No video was made for the song. The song is about a friend who went through abortion.

Track listing

Credits
Bass – Alexander Keyser
Drums – Andy Henderson 
Guitar – Glenn Johansson
Voice – Sonya Madan
Engineer – Dick Meaney
Cover Photography – Ray Burmiston
Producer – Dick Meaney and Echobelly

References

External links

1993 singles
Echobelly songs
Songs about abortion
1993 songs